Lingard is a surname. Notable people with the surname include:
 Alfred Lingard (1849–1938), British bacteriologist
 Glyn Lingard (born 1969), English rugby league footballer
 Grant Lingard (1961–1995), New Zealand artist
 Ivor Lingard (born 1942), English rugby league footballer
 Jesse Lingard (born 1992), English footballer
 Joan Lingard (1932–2022), Scottish writer
 John Lingard (1771–1851), English historian and Roman Catholic priest
 Kevin Lingard (born 1942), Australian politician
 William Lingard (1839–1927), American comic singer

See also
 Lingard, California, unincorporated community